Julian Morris  He was formerly a Research Fellow and subsequently Director of the Environment and Technology Programme of the Institute of Economic Affairs. He is also a visiting professor of Economics at the University of Buckingham. Recently he became co-editor with Indur M. Goklany of the  Electronic Journal of Sustainable Development<ref></ref>. Morris serves on the editorial advisory board of the academic journal, Energy & Environment.

Education
Morris received a MA, Economics from Edinburgh University in 1992, a MSc, Environment and Resource Economics, from University College London in  1993, a MPhil, Land Economics, from Cambridge University in  1995, and a Graduate Diploma, Law, from the University of Westminster in  1999.

Publications

Books edited 
 Okonski, K. and Morris, J. (ed) (2004): Environment and Health: Myths and Realities, London: International Policy Press.
 Morris J. (ed) (2002): Sustainable Development: Promoting Progress or Perpetuating Poverty, London: Profile Books.
 Morris, J. (ed.) (2000): Rethinking Risk and the Precautionary Principle, Oxford: Butterworth- Heinemann
 Morris, J. and Bate, R. (eds.) (1999): Fearing Food: Risk, Health and the Environment, Oxford: Butterworth-Heinemann
Morris, J. (ed.) (1997): Climate Change: Challenging the Conventional Wisdom, London: Institute of Economic Affairs.

Journal articles
Morris, J. (2008): 'When it comes to the sustainability of marine resources, institutions matter' Electronic Journal of Sustainable Development, Editorial, Vol. 1, Issue 2)
Morris, J. (2003): ‘Climbing out of the Hole: Sunsets, Subjective Value, the Environment and English Common Law,’ Fordham Environmental Law Journal, Vol XIV, No. 2, pp. 343-
Morris, J. (2002): ‘Insuring Against Negligence: Medical Indemnity in Australia’, Policy, Vol. 18, No.3, Spring, pp. 10–15.
Morris, J. (2002): ‘Real Sustainability,’ IPA Review, Vol. 54, No. 3, September, pp. 14–16.
Morris, J. (2002): ‘The Relationship between Risk Assessment and the Precautionary Principle,’ Toxicology, Vols. 181-182, pp. 127–130.
Morris, J. (2002) ‘The Precautionary Principle and Biotechnology,’ Int. J. Biotechnology, Vol 4, No. 1, pp. 46–61.
Morris, J. (2000): ‘Living in Virtual Reality,’ Economic Affairs 20 (1), March, pp. 2–4.
Morris, J. (1998 : ‘Water and the Environment’, Economic Affairs, 18 (2), pp. 2-.
Morris, J. (1996): 'Trade and the Environment', Economic Affairs, 16 (5), pp. 4–6.

Pamphlets
Morris, J, Reekie, W.D, and Moffatt, R. (2001): Ideal Matter: Globalisation and the Intellectual Property Debate, New Delhi: Liberty Institute; republished in 2002: Brussels: Centre for the New Europe. 89 pp. 
Morris, J. (2000): E Future Not € Past, London: Business for Sterling. (not in WorldCat)
Morris, J. (1997): ISO 14000: Regulation by Any Other Name?  Washington DC: Competitive Enterprise Institute.  (not in WorldCat)
Morris, J. and Scarlett, L. (1996): Buying Green, Los Angeles: The Reason Foundation. 51 pp. 
Morris, J. (1997): Green Goods? Consumers, Product Labels and the Environment, London: IEA. 109 pp. 
Morris, J. (1995): The Political Economy of Land Degradation, London: Institute of Economic Affairs. 107 pp. 
Bate, R and Morris, J. (1994): Global Warming: Apocalypse of Hot Air, London: Institute of Economic Affairs. 54 pp.

Other publications
Morris, J. (2002): "Coping with Change: Institutions for Human Habitation of Planet Earth", in Nature’s Revenge? Hurricanes, Floods and Climate Change, London: Hodder and Staughton.
Morris, J. (1999): 'Law, Property Rights, Markets and the Environment,' included in a volume edited by Hannes Gissurarson, published by University of Iceland Press.
Morris J. (1997): 'La propriete et les plantificateurs, ou comment l’Etat a detruit la campagne anglaise', in Falque et Massenet (ed.) Droits de propriete et environment, Paris: Dalloz.

References

External links
 *Julian Morris, Reason Foundation

Alumni of the University of Edinburgh
Alumni of University College London
Academics of the University of Buckingham
Alumni of the University of Westminster
British economists
Living people
Place of birth missing (living people)
Year of birth missing (living people)